The nucleus raphe obscurus, despite the implications of its name, has some very specific functions and connections of afferent and efferent nature. The nucleus raphes obscurus projects to the cerebellar lobes VI and VII and to crus II along with the nucleus raphe pontis.

The nucleus raphes obscurus has also been implicated in the modulation of the hypoglossal nerve. It has been observed that the ablation of this nucleus causes a change in the firing pattern of this cranial nerve.

In addition, the nucleus raphe obscurus mediates expiration via the effect of serotonin and depresses periodic synaptic potentials. It has also been shown that this nucleus stimulates gastrointestinal motor function; microinjections of 5-HT into the nucleus raphe obscurus increase gastric movement.

See also
 Raphe nuclei

References

Medulla oblongata